Berkley School, also known as Hosanna School, is a historic school for African Americans located in Darlington, Harford County, Maryland. It was built in 1867 and is a rectangular two-story, three-bay frame building which rests on an uncoursed rubble-stone foundation. It is one of four structures erected in Harford County in the years immediately following the Civil War for the purpose of educating freed slaves. The school was officially established with funds provided by the Freedmen's Bureau for construction and teachers salaries. The Harford County School Commissioners took over operation of the School in 1879. It continued to function as a school until 1946 when the school ceased operation. In 1954, Hurricane Hazel destroyed the second story but left the ground floor intact. The second floor was restored in 2005.

It was listed on the National Register of Historic Places in 1988.

References

External links
 Hosanna School Museum
, including photo from 1997, at Maryland Historical Trust

Defunct schools in Maryland
One-room schoolhouses in Maryland
Schoolhouses in the United States
Buildings and structures in Harford County, Maryland
School buildings on the National Register of Historic Places in Maryland
School buildings completed in 1868
Historically segregated African-American schools in Maryland
Historically black schools
National Register of Historic Places in Harford County, Maryland
Schools supported by the Freedmen's Bureau